The Argyll oil field is a depleted crude oil field in the UK sector of the central North Sea, 310 km east-south-east of Aberdeen. It was the first field to produce crude oil from the UK offshore continental shelf. Oil was produced between 1975 and 2020 through a series of floating and jack-up production installations. In later phases of development the field was known as Ardmore and then Alma. The adjacent Duncan (later Galia) and Innes fields also processed oil through the Argyll/Ardmore/Alma installation. Oil production from the field has now (2021) ceased.

The field 
The Argyll oil field is located in Blocks 30/24 and 30/25 of the UK North Sea continental shelf. The field was discovered in August 1971; the oil reservoir comprises Zechstein dolomite with an underlying Rotliegendes sandstone and a Jurassic sandstone at a depth of 8,733 – 9,373 feet (2,662–2,857 metres). The geology of the Duncan field (discovered in 1980) is similar to Argyll comprising two Jurassic reservoirs. The reservoirs and their fluids have the following characteristics:

Owners and operators 
The joint venture owners of the Argyll and Duncan fields in 1985 were Hamilton Brothers Oil Co (28.8%), Hamilton Brothers Petroleum (7.2%), RTZ Oil & Gas Ltd (25%), Blackfriars Oil Co Ltd (12.5%), Trans-European Co Ltd (2.5%), Texaco North Sea (UK) Ltd (24%).

Tuscan Energy and Acorn Oil and Gas were the owners and operators of Ardmore between 2002 and 2005.

EnQuest was the owner and operator of Alma and Galia between 2012 and 2020.

Argyll development 

The Argyll field was initially developed by Hamilton Brothers using a converted semisubmersible production and accommodation vessel (Transworld 58). In 1984 the Transworld 58 was moved to the nearby Innes field. And its place at Argyll was taken by the Deepsea Pioneer. The principal design data of these vessels was as follows.

Oil from the field was exported through the Catenary Anchor Leg Mooring facility. This was located 2.29 km from the Argyll installation at 56°10’27”N 02°49’03”E in a water depth of 77 metres. It was connected via a 7,500 feet (2,286 m) 10-inch diameter flowline from Argyll. It was capable of operating with vessels up to 100,000 dead weight tons. The first oil from the field was loaded into the tanker Theogennitor and offloaded at the BP refinery at the Isle of Grain Kent.

Production from Argyll (in 1000s barrels) was initially as shown.

Production from Innes was routed to Argyll via an 11 km 6-inch flowline.

Duncan was shutdown in October 1992, by which time it had produced  from a Stock Tank oil initially in place (STBIIP) of 47.7 STBIIP.

The Argyll, Duncan and Innes fields Argyll was shut-in in November 1992, all the wells were plugged and the facilities were removed.

Ardmore development 
Tuscan Energy and Acorn Oil and Gas assumed ownership of the field in 2002. They renamed the field Ardmore and redeveloped it with the Rowan Gorilla VII mobile drilling and production jack-up unit. Production from Ardmore began in October 2003.

The process plant was designed to process 40,000 bpd of oil. It comprised two stages of 3-phase (oil, water and gas) separation. Oil from the 2nd Stage Separator was cooled and sent to storage. Gas from the 1st Stage Separator was used as fuel gas and the excess was flared together with gas from the 2nd stage separator. Produced water from the 1st Stage Separator was treated in hydrocyclones to remove oil which was returned to the 2nd Stage Separator. Water from the hydrocyclones flowed to the Water Degassing Vessel before overboard discharge. Water from the 2nd Stage Separator was recycled to the 1st Stage Separator. Oil was sent to two single anchor leg mooring buoys located 1.5 km from Ardmore and was loaded into the two shuttle tankers.

Tuscan Energy and Acorn Oil and Gas produced  between October 2003 and June 2005.

After Ardmore ceased production in June 2005 the wells were plugged and the jack-up and loading facilities were removed from the field.

Alma and Galia development 
EnQuest assumed ownership of the field in 2010. It renamed the Argyll/Ardmore field Alma and the Duncan field as Galia. Both of the fields were redeveloped as a joint facility based on the EnQuest Producer (formerly Uisge Gorm) Floating Production, Storage and Offloading (FPSO) vessel. The processing capability was:

The water cut when the Ardmore field was closed in 2005 was 70%. EnQuest intended to redevelop the field up to 95% water cut. Six electric submersible pumps aided production. The process plant comprised two first stage separators, an interstage heater and a single second stage separator. From the latter oil flowed to the electrostatic dehydrator prior to cooling and transfer to the vessel’s storage tanks. Produced water was treated in hydrocyclones prior to overboard discharge. Gas was used as fuel gas and excess was flared.

When EnQuest ceased production in June 2020 the wells were plugged and facilities removed.

References 

North Sea oil fields
Oil fields of Scotland
Oil fields of the United Kingdom